Cayenne may refer to:
 Cayenne, the capital of French Guiana
 Cayenne pepper
 Cayenne (mascot)
 "Cayenne" (song), by the Beatles 
 Porsche Cayenne, a luxury SUV manufactured by Porsche
 Skywalk Cayenne, a German paraglider design

Software:
 Apache Cayenne
 Cayenne (programming language)

Other 
 Isle de Cayenne, island in French Guiana

See also